John Quirk (born 28 July 1945) is a former Australian rules footballer who played with Melbourne in the Victorian Football League (VFL).

After playing with Melbourne, Quirk played with Port Melbourne and then Box Hill in the Victorian Football Association.

After retiring from football, John went on to have 3 children; Damien, Sebastian and his favourite, Felicity. He has 4 grandchildren; Arabella (amazing netballer), William (gamer extraordinaire), Harry (brilliant footballer) and Willow (fantastic all rounder). 
John then went on and lived in the Hunter Valley, where he became a CEO at a winery. He then moved to Echuca to be closer to his family.

Notes

External links 

1945 births
Living people
Australian rules footballers from Victoria (Australia)
Melbourne Football Club players
Port Melbourne Football Club players
Box Hill Football Club players